The Tramway of Clairvaux (French Tramway des Fours à Chaux) was a more than  long narrow-gauge railway with a gauge of  in Ville-sous-la-Ferté near Clairvaux Abbey.

Route 
The main line ran on the départemental road D 396 in the Aube Valley  to connect the hamlets Les Forges Saint Bernard, Le Four à Chaux and Clairvaux of the municipality Ville-sous-la-Ferté. It started at Clairvaux railway station on the Paris-Est–Mulhouse-Ville railway between Troyes and Culmont-Chalindrey. It passed  the Usines du Pont Rouge, a subsidiary of the iron-frame bed manufacturer Etablissements Berl in Luxemburg, which are now owned by Regnier, a manufacturer of wooden seat panels.
 It also passed the Hotel Saint Bernard, just opposite Clairvaux Abbey, which is now being used as a high-security prison, where it regularly stopped for refreshments and for taking photographs. From there it continued probably to other lime quarries and furnaces.

It was mainly used for goods transport of mineral products such as lime, cement and coal and had sidings at the following companies:
 Société des Chaux Hydrauliques et Ciments de l'Aube
 Usines Poliet & Chausson, a lime producer
 Usine Saint-Bernard, a lime producer
 Usine de Chaux Convert et Maugras (subsequently Société des Chaux Hydrauliques et Ciments de l'Aube)

Locomotives 

At least two steam locomotives were owned by the Société des Chaux Hydrauliques et Ciments to be used on this line:
 0-6-0T Corpet-Louvet with a Systeme Brown control, No 539 delivered on 23 March 1891
 0-6-0T O&K No 2849 delivered around 1911

References 

600 mm gauge railways in France
Tram transport in France
Ville-sous-la-Ferté